Dariyabad is a town and a aadharsh  nagar panchayat in Barabanki district  in the state of Uttar Pradesh, India.

History
It is said that, Dariyabad was founded in 1436 AD and established in 1444 AD. Dariya Khan was posted as viceroy after Sultan Mirza Badshah, and came to Awadh Lucknow and stayed in Imperial castle in Mahmudabad. Since this place was famous due to violence by bhad tribe, later viceroy Dariya Khan freed this place by Bhad tribe and named this place as Dariyabad on his own name. But as per some old age seniors and references Dariya Khan was an officer of Delhi kingdom.

Demographics
 India census, Dariyabad had a population of 15,661. Males constitute 52% of the population and females 48%. Dariyabad has an average literacy rate of 67%, lower than the national average of 79.9%: male literacy is 74% and, female literacy is 61%. In Dariyabad, 17% of the population is under 6 years of age.

Politics
Dariyabad (Assembly constituency) represents the area.

Notable residents
 Abdul Majid Daryabadi - Indian Muslim writer and exegete of the Qur'an
 Major General Afsir Karim - Indian author and Retd. Major General Indian Army
 Shafey Kidwai - Indian academic, communication scientist, translator, columnist and author.

References

Cities and towns in Barabanki district